Bab Sebta (English: Door of Ceuta) is a Portuguese 2008 documentary film.

Synopsis 
Beginning with the 2005 violence at the Melilla and Ceuta border fences, Bab Sebta interviews people in four North African cities to explore why some people are willing to risk all to emigrate to Europe. Interviews took place in Tangier and Oujda in Morocco, and Nouadhibou and Nouakchott in Mauritania.

Awards 
 FIDMarseille 2008
 Doclisboa 2008

See also
Victimes de nos richesses, a 2006 documentary film about violence at the Melilla and Ceuta border fences.

References

External links

2008 films
Portuguese documentary films
2008 documentary films
Documentary films about immigration
Ceuta
Films shot in Morocco
Documentary films about African politics